Even Murderers Take Holidays and Other Mysteries is a collection of mystery stories by the British thriller writer Michael Gilbert, first published in 2007 by the British company Robert Hale and unpublished in the United States. It contains 25 previously uncollected stories, as well as an introduction by John Cooper and an appendix. The first twelve stories feature Inspector Petrella, one of the many recurring characters that Gilbert created throughout his long career of writing both novels and short stories. Its next story has Mr. Calder and Mr. Behrens, and there are four stories about Inspector Hazlerigg. Gilbert, who was appointed CBE in 1980, was a founder-member of the British Crime Writers' Association. The Mystery Writers of America named him a Grand Master in 1988 and in 1990 he was presented Bouchercon's Lifetime Achievement Award.  The locales are mostly set in London and its environs.  A number of the stories, such as "Somebody" and "Old Mr Martin", have an unexpected grimness about them. "Michael was an exceptionally fine storyteller, but he's hard to classify," said one of his American publishers after his death. "He's not a hard-boiled writer in the classic sense, but there is a hard edge to him, a feeling within his work that not all of society is rational, that virtue is not always rewarded."

Stories in order
Introduction, page 7, by John Cooper
The Girl Who Moved, page 10 — Detective Constable Petrella
Somebody, page 18 — Detective Sergeant Petrella
Amateur Detective, page 25 — Detective Sergeant Petrella
Counter Attack, page 35 — Detective Sergeant Petrella
Deep and Crisp and Even, page 45 — Detective Sergeant Petrella
It Never Pays to be Too Clever, page 53 — Detective Sergeant Petrella
Kendrew's Private War, page 58 — Detective Inspector Petrella
The White Slaves, page 68  — Detective Inspector Petrella, a mention of Wilfred Wetherall
A Real Born Killer, page 81 — Detective Inspector Petrella, a brief role for Wilfred Wetherall
Old Mr Martin, page 91 — Detective Inspector Petrella
The Facts of Life, page 100 — Detective Inspector Petrella, a brief role for Wilfred Wetherall
The Battle of Bank Street, page 110
Double, Double, page 124 — Mr. Calder and Mr. Behrens
Death Duties, page 140
A Nose in a Million, page 144
Snuffy, page 153
Death Money, page 158
Even Murderers Take Holidays, page 162
The Drop Shot, page 167
Cumberland v Cumberland, page 171
The Indifferent Shot, page 174
Hangover, page 179
When A Girl Moves Among Diplomats, page 184
Twm Carney, page 188
A Very Special Relationship, page 192
The Smiler, page 204
Mrs Haslet's Gone, page 216
Appendix, page 220

References

External links

2007 short story collections
Robert Hale books
Mystery short story collections
British short story collections
Short story collections by Michael Gilbert